Jena High School is a secondary school located in Jena, Louisiana, United States. The school, serving grades 9 through 12, is a part of the LaSalle Parish School Board. As of 20062007, the school enrollment was 538 students.

The school serves the town of Jena and the unincorporated communities of Belah, Nebo, and Rhinehart.

History

2006 student fight gains national attention

The high school reflects the population of the town and about 10% of its students are African Americans. At times there have been tensions between different groups of students, including some groups divided by race. Beginning September 1, 2006, several incidents in the area occurred which some observers thought were all related to racial tensions. Law enforcement investigations by parish and federal prosecutors did not support that conclusion for each incident.

On December 4, 2006 a fight broke out on campus, in which six African-American students assaulted a white student. They were arrested and five were charged with attempted second-degree murder. As prosecution of their case gained national attention because of the severity of the charges in relation to the students' ages, they were later dubbed the Jena 6. The complex case and related issues have been highly controversial and eventually attracted widespread national media attention, development of a legal defense fund, and thousands of protesters at an event in support of one of the students. It is covered in full at the main article noted above, as the trials, appeals, changes in charges and subsequent sentencing have taken years to play out. These elements reflect more about the criminal justice system, racial discrimination, and media coverage than they relate specifically to this high school.
 
For a time the town gained international notoriety, described by the UK's The Observer as a place showing the "new 'stealth' racism" in America. National attention was drawn to the events by a National Public Radio prime time story on July 30, 2007. John Mellencamp released a song called "Jena" in August 2007, which referred to events at the small high school.

Feeder patterns
The following schools feed into Jena High School:
 Fellowship Elementary School (grades PreK–8)
 Jena Junior High School (grades 6–8)
 Goodpine Middle School (grades 3–5)
 Jena Elementary School (grades PreK–2)
 Nebo Elementary School (grades PreK–8)

Athletics
Jena High athletics competes in the LHSAA.

Notable alumni
Jason Hatcher, NFL player

References

External links

 http://www.thejenatimes.net/
 http://www.lasallepsb.com/

Public high schools in Louisiana
Schools in LaSalle Parish, Louisiana
Crimes in Louisiana